Eresos-Antissa is a former municipality on the island of Lesbos, North Aegean, Greece. From the 2010 local government reform until 2019 it was part of the municipality of Lesbos and since 2019 it is a municipali unit of the municipality of West Lesvos. It is located in the westernmost part of the island, and is the largest municipal unit of the island in land area at 290.947 km². Its population was 5,269 at the 2011 census. The seat of the municipality was in Eresos (pop. 1,086). The next largest towns are Antissa (908), Mesótopos (773), Vatoússa (574) and Chidira (472).

Notable people 
Terpander (7th century BC) poet and citharode

References

Populated places in Lesbos